Mávila Milagros Huertas Centurión (born 24 December 1970) is a Peruvian journalist, writer, actress, and radio and television presenter.

Biography
The daughter of José Huertas and Amarilis Centurión, Mávila studied communication sciences at the University of Lima. She later contributed to the magazine Somos and was the main editor of the magazine Intercambio.

In 1992, Huertas began to work as an investigative reporter for several television channels.

On Panamericana Televisión, Huertas hosted the programs  and Reportajes, as well as presenting the news show  on ATV.

For several years she taught journalism at the Universidad Peruana de Ciencias Aplicadas.

In 2001 she won the third National Journalism Competition in the category of Best Television Report for "Milagro en Sonene", about Taricaya turtle conservation efforts in native communities in the Peruvian jungle.

She also acted in the short film Desaparecida.

Later she headed the central edition of the news program  on América Televisión. As an announcer, she briefly hosted the news show Hoy por Hoy on CPN Radio.

In 2009, she published the book Los Reyes del Mambo: diez historias para entender el éxito en el Perú (The Kings of Mambo: Ten Stories to Understand Success in Peru).

Huertas married producer Roberto Reátegui in December 2009. They divorced in May 2013.

In 2011 she wrote and directed the documentary Machu Picchu, la joya del emperador (Machu Picchu, The Jewel of the Emperor).

In 2012 she wrote and directed her second documentary, Amazonas, la ruta indomable (Amazonas, the Indomitable Route).

In mid-2013 Huertas shot Frontera azul, mar peruano (Blue Border, Peruvian Sea), completing the documentary trilogy.

Television work

Presenter
 Primero a las 8 (Canal N, 2013 – present)
  (América Televisión, 2013), guest judge
  (América Televisión, 2004 – present)
  (Andina de Televisión, 2003–2004)
 Reportajes (Panamericana Televisión, 2002–2003)
  (Panamericana Televisión, 2001–2003)
 América Noticias - Primera Edición (América Televisión, 1999–2001)

Reporter
 La Clave
 Contrapunto

References

External links
 

Peruvian journalists
Peruvian women journalists
1970 births
20th-century journalists
21st-century journalists
21st-century Peruvian actresses
Living people
People from Arequipa
Peruvian documentary film directors
Peruvian television presenters
Peruvian women writers
University of Lima alumni
Peruvian radio presenters
Peruvian women radio presenters
Women television journalists
Women documentary filmmakers
Peruvian women television presenters
20th-century women journalists
21st-century women journalists